The Biggest Robbery Never Told is a 2002 Spanish comedy film directed by Daniel Monzón and written by Jorge Guerricaechevarría.

In 2003 the film was nominated for a Goya Award for the Best Special Effects.

Plot 
Lucas Santos, alias The Saint (Antonio Resines), is fed up with going in and out of prison. He doesn't want to go on being a small-time thief all his life. Lucía (Neus Asensi), his wife, is a singer and dancer by profession. One day, The Saint decides to plan the robbery of one of the most representative works of modern art: Pablo Picasso's Guernica from the Reina Sofía Museum.

To achieve his purpose will be aided by another three convicts: Zorba (Manuel Manquiña) a failed artist, Jacobo Yuste (Jimmy Barnatán) a hacker known as "Windows", and Pinito (Javier Aller), a dwarf burglar able to hide in a suitcase despite his claustrophobia.

Cast 
Antonio Resines: Lucas Santos Santos "El Santo" (The Saint)
Neus Asensi: Lucía de Liñán "Lucy"
Javier Aller: Pinito
Manuel Manquiña: Zorba "El Greco" 
Jimmy Barnatán: Jacobo Yuste "Windows" 
Rosario Pardo: Windows's mother
Sancho Gracia: Fernando Baeza "Garganta Profunda" (Deep Throat)
Javivi: Barajas Airport worker
Enrique Villén: Vicente
Coté Soler: Fernando
Jordi Vilches: Windows's Friend

References

External links 
 

2002 films
Spanish comedy films
Madrid in fiction
Films scored by Roque Baños
Films with screenplays by Jorge Guerricaechevarría